Héctor Pérez (born 7 July 1959) is a Mexican former cyclist. He competed in two events at the 1988 Summer Olympics.

References

External links
 

1959 births
Living people
Mexican male cyclists
Olympic cyclists of Mexico
Cyclists at the 1988 Summer Olympics
Place of birth missing (living people)